Hugo Hagen (1818 – 14 April 1871, Berlin) was a German sculptor.

Life 

He was a student of Ludwig Wilhelm Wichmann. From 1842 to 1857, he was an assistant in the studios of Christian Daniel Rauch, where he contributed to creating the statues of Frederick the Great on the Unter den Linden, Albrecht Thaer at Humboldt University and Immanuel Kant in Königsberg. In 1865, he became the Director of the "Rauch-Museum". After the early death of Hermann Schievelbein, he helped complete the monument to Heinrich Friedrich Karl vom Stein. He also assisted Rudolf Siemering to complete Johann Gottfried Schadow's "Münzfrieses" (Coin Friezes) on the Old Berlin Mint.

Ironically, many of his own works were left incomplete when he died.

Selected major works 
 1860/1861: Group, "Grace with Pegasus", on the roof of the Altes Museum 
 1862: Monument for Friedrich Wilhelm, Count Brandenburg on the Leipziger Platz 
 1866/1869: Johann Gottfried Schadow Monument on the porch of the Altes Museum 
 1866/1869: Powerscourt Estate, County Wicklow, Ireland. Two winged horses for the "Triton Lake" and allegorical figures of "Fame" and "Victory", after designs by Rauch.
 1866: "Wrangelbrunnen" (fountain), in honor of Field Marshal Friedrich von Wrangel. The fountain wasn't completed and installed until 1877. Originally on the Kemperplatz, it is now at the corner of Urbanstraße and Grimmstraße in Berlin-Kreuzberg.

Sources 
 Peter Bloch: Bildwerke 1780-1910, Berlin, Staatliche Museen Preussischer Kulturbesitz, 1990
 Ethos und Pathos. Die Berliner Bildhauerschule 1786-1914, Exhibition Catalog, by Peter Bloch, Sibylle Einholz und Jutta von Simson. Berlin, Mann, 1990 
 J. Kuhn: Hagen, Hugo. In: Allgemeines Künstlerlexikon. Die Bildenden Künstler aller Zeiten und Völker (AKL). Vol.67, de Gruyter, Berlin 2010, pgs.422–424

External links 

1818 births
1871 deaths
German sculptors
German male sculptors
19th-century sculptors